Borok is a rural locality (a settlement) and the administrative center of Kemskoye Rural Settlement, Nikolsky District, Vologda Oblast, Russia. The population was 50 as of 2002. There are 15 streets.

Geography 
Borok is located 47 km west of Nikolsk (the district's administrative centre) by road. Demino is the nearest rural locality.

References 

Rural localities in Nikolsky District, Vologda Oblast